South Salem is a village in Ross County, Ohio, United States. The population was 204 at the 2010 census.

History
In 1842, local Presbyterian minister Hugh Stewart Fullerton orchestrated the establishment of a school in southwestern Ross County.  Known as the "Salem Academy," this school became the foundation of the present village: landowner John Sample platted South Salem in 1846 in order better to serve the students and teachers of the school.  After two years of rapid growth, the village reached the point that it could easily serve the needs of the school, and growth ceased.  Although South Salem incorporated in the 1870s, few other changes occurred during the late years of the nineteenth century.  In 1917, its population was deemed to be between 350 and 400 residents, a size that had remained consistent since the 1850s.  The Salem Academy (by then known as the "South Salem Academy") closed in 1907 due to competition from other schools, and since that time, the village has declined in population.

Supposed royalty
According to legend, Mary A. Harriett was born on March 12, 1818, in London, England, the daughter of Queen Victoria's father, Prince Edward, Duke of Kent and Strathearn. There is no proof of this relationship as autobiographies of Prince Edward fail to mention this fact. Edward, the fourth son of King George III, married Victoria's mother, Princess Victoria of Saxe-Coburg-Saalfeld on May 29, 1818. Their daughter Alexandrina Victoria was born on May 24, 1819. Mary was primed for the role of queen, but lost all hope of obtaining the throne when she married a commoner, Blyth Jagward Morter. The couple received a marriage settlement of around 3,000 British pounds. However, with the dowry, Mary was ostracized from her royal family because marriage to a commoner was a serious offense.

The Morter family then decided to give up their unhappy life in England and migrate to the United States in 1850. Morter went ahead to build a home and set himself up in business. When he was ready to send for Mary and their children, he wrote them saying he would meet them in New York City. However he heard nothing from his wife and concern for his family's welfare took him back to England. She apparently had received the letter since she was crossing the Atlantic Ocean at the same time Morter was returning for her. When she and the children arrived in New York City and found no one to meet them, fear and poverty set in. After what must have seemed an endless few months, Morter arrived back in the United States.

The family then traveled by canal and stagecoach to South Salem in 1851. The family moved into their home but it was not yet completed. The windows were still not in place and the plaster was wet. Mary, her condition probably weakened by her journey to Ohio, developed a cold, then tuberculosis, and died shortly afterwards.
 
Morter carved his wife's tombstone and buried her in the South Salem Cemetery. Her tombstone reads "Mary A. wife of B. J. Morter, native of England, Died April 16, 1852, aged 34 years, 1 mo. 4 days." Then at the very bottom of the tombstone is the single word "Think". When Blyth Morter carved the word "Think" on his wife's tombstone, perhaps he knew that future generations would stop and look at the grave and would indeed Think.

Geography
South Salem is located at  (39.336418, -83.307392).

Demographics

2010 census
As of the census of 2010, there were 204 people, 80 households, and 58 families residing in the village. The racial makeup of the village was 98.5% White, 1.0% African American, and 0.5% from two or more races.

There were 80 households, of which 35.0% had children under the age of 18 living with them, 55.0% were married couples living together, 13.8% had a female householder with no husband present, 3.8% had a male householder with no wife present, and 27.5% were non-families. 21.3% of all households were made up of individuals, and 7.6% had someone living alone who was 65 years of age or older. The average household size was 2.55 and the average family size was 2.90.

The median age in the village was 42 years. 23% of residents were under the age of 18; 5.8% were between the ages of 18 and 24; 27.5% were from 25 to 44; 31.3% were from 45 to 64; and 12.3% were 65 years of age or older. The gender makeup of the village was 49.0% male and 51.0% female.

2000 census
As of the census of 2000, there were 213 people, 77 households, and 60 families residing in the village. The population density was 1,027.8 people per square mile (391.6/km). There were 81 housing units at an average density of 390.8 per square mile (148.9/km). The racial makeup of the village was 96.24% White, 0.94% African American, 0.47% Native American, 0.94% from other races, and 1.41% from two or more races. Hispanic or Latino of any race were 1.41% of the population.

There were 77 households, out of which 37.7% had children under the age of 18 living with them, 64.9% were married couples living together, 10.4% had a female householder with no husband present, and 20.8% were non-families. 16.9% of all households were made up of individuals, and 10.4% had someone living alone who was 65 years of age or older. The average household size was 2.77 and the average family size was 3.11.

In the village, the population was spread out, with 25.4% under the age of 18, 8.0% from 18 to 24, 33.8% from 25 to 44, 20.7% from 45 to 64, and 12.2% who were 65 years of age or older. The median age was 35 years. For every 100 females there were 113.0 males. For every 100 females age 18 and over, there were 93.9 males.

The median income for a household in the village was $32,500, and the median income for a family was $37,250. Males had a median income of $31,563 versus $22,500 for females. The per capita income for the village was $12,762. About 6.3% of families and 14.0% of the population were below the poverty line, including 17.7% of those under the age of eighteen and 17.4% of those 65 or over.

References

Populated places established in 1846
Villages in Ross County, Ohio
Villages in Ohio
1846 establishments in Ohio